The Stork Club is a 2006 book by British author and journalist Imogen Edwards-Jones. The book, based on the author’s Daily Telegraph column "Shall I Be a Mother?", is an autobiographical account of Edward-Jones’ attempts to conceive. The book outlines Imogen Edwards-Jones’ treatment by IVF.

The paperback edition was published on 2 April 2007.

2006 non-fiction books
Human reproduction
Bantam Press books